Bell II is an unincorporated community in the Skeena Mountains of northwestern British Columbia, Canada. The name derives from being located at the second bridge crossing of the Bell-Irving River. In addition to being a pit stop on the Stewart-Cassiar Highway, Bell II is one of the largest heliskiing areas operated by Last Frontier Heliskiing.

History
Bell II began in 1979 when Ernie Kreese built Bell 2 Crossing in 1979 as a basic gas station and garage for travellers heading to the Yukon and Alaska, just south the second crossing of the Bell-Irving River, with a small restaurant and cabins later added to the facility. In 1990, Bell II (not Bell 2 or Bell Two) was adopted as an official place due to it being a well-established local name.  In 1996, the founding partners of Last Frontier Heliskiing, George Rosset, Franz Fux, Mike Watling and Geoff Straight explored the Skeena Mountains surrounding Bell II to evaluate the potential for a new heliskiing destination.  In 1998, they purchased the property renamed it Bell 2 Lodge and between 1998 and 2003 completely rebuilt and expanded the facility, with additional upgrades in 2013.

Biogeography
Bell II lies in the Interior Cedar-Hemlock zone, very wet cold subzone or ICHvc. The area's dominant tree is Subalpine Fir. White Spruce is common. Hemlock is inconspicuous on the alluvial land around the lodge, but is common in upland forests nearby. Cedar is not native to the area. The most prominent deciduous tree is Black Cottonwood. Shrubs include Thimbleberry, Goatsbeard, and Devil's Club. Large animals such as moose, black bear, grizzly bear and wolf are common.

References

Unincorporated settlements in British Columbia
Populated places in the Regional District of Kitimat–Stikine
Nass Country